= Jakes Island =

Island in California

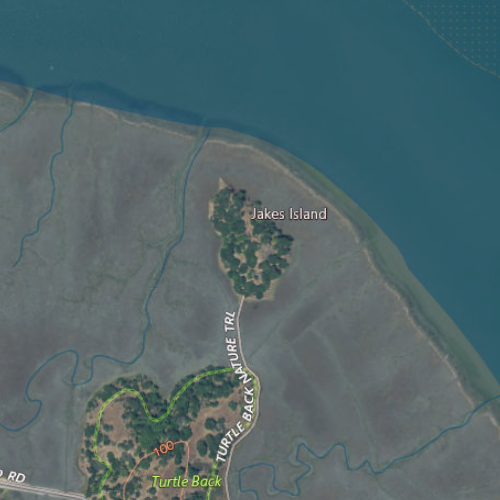
- USGS aerial imagery of Jakes Island

- Location within San Francisco Bay Area Location within California Location within the United States

Geography
- Location: Northern California
- Coordinates: 38°00′47″N 122°29′20″W
- Adjacent to: San Francisco Bay
- Highest elevation: 52 ft (15.8 m)

Administration
- United States
- State: California
- County: Marin

Jakes Island is an island in San Francisco Bay. It is in Marin County, California. Its coordinates are 38°00′47″N 122°29′20″W, and the United States Geological Survey gives its elevation as 52 ft (16 m). Egrets can be seen there.
